The Roman Catholic Diocese of Carúpano is a diocese located in the city of Carúpano in the Ecclesiastical province of Cumaná in Venezuela.

History
On 4 April 2000 Blessed John Paul II established the Diocese of Carúpano from the Metropolitan Archdiocese of Cumaná.

Ordinaries
Manuel Felipe Díaz Sánchez (4 Apr 2000 – 10 Dec 2008) Appointed, Archbishop of Calabozo
Jaime José Villarroel Rodríguez (10 Apr 2010 – present)

See also
Roman Catholicism in Venezuela

References

External links
 GCatholic.org
 Catholic Hierarchy 

Roman Catholic dioceses in Venezuela
Roman Catholic Ecclesiastical Province of Cumaná
Christian organizations established in 2000
Roman Catholic dioceses and prelatures established in the 20th century
2000 establishments in Venezuela